.nu is the Internet country code top-level domain (ccTLD) assigned to the island state of Niue. It was one of the first ccTLDs to be marketed to the Internet at large as an alternative to the gTLDs .com, .net, and .org. Playing on the phonetic similarity between nu and new in English, and the fact that  means "now" in several northern European languages, it was promoted as a new TLD with an abundance of good domain names available. The .nu domain is now controlled by the Internet Foundation in Sweden amid opposition from the government of Niue.

Administration

The government of Niue was recognized as the holder of legal rights to administer the .nu domain until 2003, when it signed the rights away to the IUSN Foundation, a Massachusetts-based non-profit organization created for the purpose of funding free unlimited internet access and wifi in Niue through revenue from the domain name. The administration and technical operation of the domain were transferred to The Internet Foundation in Sweden (IIS) in September 2013. The IIS said that 66.7 percent of "active" .nu domains at the time were registered to Swedish users. As of 2020, the IUSN Foundation states on its website that it still provides free internet access to Niue through a partnership with IIS, which funds IUSN's entire budget with a portion of the revenues from the .nu domain.

In November 2018, the government of Niue initiated a lawsuit against the IIS in the Stockholm District Court to obtain control over the domain. It stated that the Foundation had "taken over Niue's .nu domain without consent in 2013", resulting in a significant loss of revenue for the country. Niue's government stated that the .nu domain was a "national asset of Niue" and had been taken over "unfairly", estimating that it had earned between $27 million and $37 million for the IIS. A later estimate by Niue's legal team stated that the country had missed out on a total of  during the combined time that the domain had been administered by IUSN and the IIS. The IIS responded by saying that "It was and is essential for the Swedish internet infrastructure that .nu works in a stable and secure way", and that it had "done the necessary investigations before deciding to become the registry in 2013, involving several leading legal specialists and a direct contact with the relevant governmental institutions".

The government of Niue continues the legal discussion on two fronts: directly with ICANN to get the domain name back, and with the Swedish government to reclaim the lost profits. Toke Talagi, the Premier of Niue from 2008 to 2020, called it a form of neo-colonialism.

Usage of .nu
Although  in Norwegian is an archaic word for "now", with  being used instead, .nu was initially more popular than .no, with 43,000 .nu addresses being registered in Norway in 1999 compared to 30,000 .no ones. Partially owing to restrictive domain rules for the ccTLD assigned to Sweden, .se, .nu was used for creative marketing of websites such as www.tv.nu to show what is currently showing on TV, and in the Netherlands for websites like waarbenjij.nu, Dutch for whereareyou.now.

A former political party in Israel, Kulanu, used the domain www.koola.nu until its dissolution in 2020.

Internationalised domains
In March 2000, .NU Domain Ltd became the first TLD to offer registration of Internationalized domain names, supporting the full Unicode character set. Unlike other TLDs, no browser plugin or punycode capable browser was required on the client side for use of these names, as .NU Domain's web servers converted and redirected any web queries issued in a variety of international character encodings. However, in March 2010, .NU Domain announced at ICANN that they had recently disabled their general wildcard domain name resolution technology, and thus were implementing IDNs only by the now standard punycode implementation, and were reducing the accepted set of IDN characters for .NU Domain names to a subset of the ISO-8859-1 western European characters.

Domain revocation policy
.NU domain names are revoked without refund for displaying images of child pornography, being involved with phishing, spamming, email theft, search engine abuse, or any unlawful purpose.

In February 2012, library.nu, a site listing links to scanned books, a substantial number of which are claimed to be pirated copyrighted material, went offline after a coalition of the world's largest book publishers obtained an injunction against the site. A few days later the site also had its domain name revoked by domain registrar Nunames. The domain revocation was recorded in screenshots taken at the time.

Litigation
A 2005 UDRP case regarding nudomain.com made the assertion under "Factual background" that "The Complainants [WorldNames, Inc. and NU Domain Ltd] own and operate the .NU ccTLD". The companies in question are operating the registry for .nu on behalf of the Internet Users Society, but it is incorrect to state that they "own" the TLD, as TLDs in general are delegated and managed rather than "owned". The case does, however, point out that these companies own a registered trademark to ".nudomain" in several countries.

McAfee SiteAdvisor
In March 2007, McAfee SiteAdvisor issued a report explaining the functionality of SiteAdvisor. As part of that report, .nu domain websites were stated to be among the highest-risk TLDs for browser exploits. However, in most other respects, .nu sites were ranked overall as a low to moderate risk. Shortly thereafter, .NU Domain issued a press release stating that SiteAdvisor had ranked .nu sites among the lowest for risk. In 2008 McAfee reported that .net and .com had become the riskiest TLDs.

References

Further reading

External links
 IANA WHOIS record for .nu
 .nu Domain Registry
 IUSN Foundation
 IUSN's WiFi Nation
 Internet Niue
 Niue is dead. Long live .nu!, The Register
 Official website of the government of Niue

Country code top-level domains
Communications in Niue